Abba (Ba) bar Zabdai (Hebrew: אבא בר זבדי)  was a Palestinian amora who flourished in the 3rd century. He studied in Babylonia, attending the lectures of Rab and Rav Huna, and subsequently settled at Tiberias, where he occupied a respected position by the side of Rav Ammi and Assi. Mention is made of his custom of saying his prayers in a loud voice (Yer. Berachot iv.7a). Of his haggadic productions there exists, among others, a sermon for a public fast-day, on Lamentations iii.41 (Yer. Ta'anit, ii.65a), from which the following may be quoted:

Other quotes 
Though he may have sinned, he is still an Israelite!

The myrtle that stands amongst the reeds is still a myrtle.

Jewish Encyclopedia bibliography
Bacher, Ag. Pal. Amor. iii.533, 535;
Frankel, Mebo, pp. 66a, 67.

References

Talmud rabbis
3rd-century rabbis
Year of birth unknown
Year of death unknown
People from Tiberias